The 41st Annual TV Week Logie Awards was held on Sunday 11 April 1999 at the Crown Palladium in Melbourne, and broadcast on the Nine Network. The ceremony was hosted by Andrew Denton, and guests included Isaac Hayes, Kevin Sorbo, Kathy Griffin, Portia De Rossi and Trudie Goodwin.

Winners and nominees
In the tables below, winners are listed first and highlighted in bold.

Gold Logie

Acting/Presenting

Most Popular Programs

Most Outstanding Programs

Performers
Isaac Hayes
Deborah Conway

Hall of Fame
After a lifetime in Australian television, Mike Walsh became the 16th inductee into the TV Week Logies Hall of Fame.

References

External links
 

1999 television awards
1999
1999 in Australian television